Brian Camozzi (born June 24, 1991) is an American mixed martial artist. He was the Welterweight Champion for Resurrection Fighting Alliance and Sparta Combat League. Camozzi currently competes in Welterweight division of the Ultimate Fighting Championship (UFC). He is the younger brother of former UFC Middleweight fighter Chris Camozzi.

Background 

Camozzi was born in Alameda, California and he has a brother, Chris Camozzi, who is an MMA fighter, and formerly fought for the UFC in the middleweight division. He played rugby, football and competed in wrestling when he was in high school. He was introduced to MMA by his older brother Chris, who paid for his gym fee up until Camozzi graduated from high school. Camozzi fell in love with the sport after his first BJJ and kickboxing classes. He started train full-time after high school and participated in MMA competition not long after.

Mixed martial arts career

Early career 

Camozzi made his professional MMA debut in January 2013 for Sparta Combat League and he has fought for other promotions including North American Allied Fight Series, Fight to Win and Resurrection Fighting Alliance. He amassed a record of 7-2 prior joining UFC.

Ultimate Fighting Championship 

Camozzi made his short notice promotional debut, replacing Charlie Ward citing a visa issue, on December 9, 2016, at UFC Fight Night: Lewis vs. Abdurakhimov against Randy Brown in Albany, New York. He lost the fight via TKO on round two.

Camozzi was expected to face Alan Jouban at UFC 213 on July 8, 2017. However, Jouban was removed from the card citing foot injury replaced by Chad Laprise.  Laprise won the fight via TKO in the third round.

Camozzi faced Geoff Neal on February 18, 2018, at UFC Fight Night: Cowboy vs. Medeiros. He lost the bout via submission in the first round.

Championships and accomplishments

Mixed martial arts 
 Resurrection Fighting Alliance
 Resurrection Fighting Alliance Welterweight Champion  (One time) vs. Nick Barnes
Sparta Combat League  
Sparta Combat League Welterweight Champion  (One time) vs. Matt Cox

Personal life 

Camozzi's brother, Chris Camozzi, is a mixed martial artist who competed under the UFC banner from April 2015 to May 2017.

Mixed martial arts record

|-
|Loss
|align=center|7–5
|Geoff Neal
|Submission (rear naked choke)
|UFC Fight Night: Cowboy vs. Medeiros 
|
|align=center|1
|align=center|2:48
|Austin, Texas, United States
|
|-
|Loss
|align=center|7–4
|Chad Laprise
|TKO (punches)
|UFC 213
|
|align=center|3
|align=center|1:27
|Las Vegas, Nevada, United States
|
|-
| Loss
| align=center| 7–3
| Randy Brown
| TKO (knee and punches)
| UFC Fight Night: Lewis vs. Abdurakhimov
| 
| align=center| 2
| align=center| 1:25
| Albany, New York, United States
|
|-
| Win
| align=center| 7–2
| Nick Barnes
| Technical Submission (guillotine choke)
| RFA 43
| 
| align=center| 1
| align=center| 1:40
| Broomfield, Colorado, United States
| 
|-
| Win
| align=center| 6–2
| Kenneth Glenn
| KO (knee)
| RFA 37
| 
| align=center| 3
| align=center| 1:02
| Sioux Falls, South Dakota, United States
|
|-
| Win
| align=center| 5–2
| Tyler Milner
| Submission (rear-naked choke)
| RFA 34
| 
| align=center| 1
| align=center| 1:20
| Broomfield, Colorado, United States
|
|-
| Win
| align=center| 4–2
| Matt Cox
| Submission (armbar)
| Sparta Combat League 40
| 
| align=center| 1
| align=center| 2:06
| Denver, Colorado, United States
|
|-
| Win
| align=center| 3–2
| Brian Maronek
| TKO (punches)
| Sparta Combat League: Fall Brawl
| 
| align=center| 1
| align=center| 1:18
| Denver, Colorado, United States
|
|-
| Loss
| align=center| 2–2
| Josh Cavan
| Decision (split)
| Fight to Win: Prize FC 5
| 
| align=center| 3
| align=center| 5:00
| Denver, Colorado, United States
|
|-
| Loss
| align=center| 2–1
| George Comer
| Decision (unanimous)
| North American Allied Fight Series 9
| 
| align=center| 3
| align=center| 5:00
| Cleveland, Ohio, United States
|
|-
| Win
| align=center| 2–0
| Ian Stonehouse
| TKO (slam and punches)
| Sparta Combat League: Fight for the Troops
| 
| align=center| 1
| align=center| 1:19
| Loveland, Colorado, United States
|
|-
| Win
| align=center| 1–0
| Cruz Soltero
| Submission (rear-naked choke)
| Sparta Combat League: Prepare For Glory
| 
| align=center| 1
| align=center| 3:52
| Denver, Colorado, United States
|
|-

See also
 List of current UFC fighters
 List of male mixed martial artists

References

External links
 
 

Living people
1991 births
American male mixed martial artists
Welterweight mixed martial artists
Mixed martial artists utilizing wrestling
Mixed martial artists utilizing Brazilian jiu-jitsu
Ultimate Fighting Championship male fighters
American practitioners of Brazilian jiu-jitsu